Carole Satyamurti (13 August 1939 – 13 August 2019) was a British poet, sociologist, and translator.

Personal life
Satyamurti grew up in Kent, and lived in North America, Singapore and Uganda. She lived in London until her death on 13 August 2019, aged 80.

Career
She taught at the University of East London and at the Tavistock Clinic, where her main interest was relating psychoanalytic ideas to the stories people tell about themselves, whether in formal autobiography or everyday encounters.

She was a writer in residence at the University of Sussex and the College of Charleston. She taught for the Arvon Foundation and for the Poetry School. She was vice-president of Ver Poets, a group of writers and poetry lovers based in St Albans. She ran poetry programmes in Venice, Corfu and the National Gallery (London), with Gregory Warren Wilson.

Awards
Satyamurti won many awards including:
 1986 National Poetry Competition
 1988 and 2008 Arts Council Writers' Award
 2000 Cholmondeley Award
 2007 short-listed Forward Prize
2015 Roehampton Poetry Prize

Works
 "Chesil Beach", poetry pf
 "Lust in Translation"; "How I Altered History"; "Woman Pursued by Dragon Flees into the Desert"; "Dear Departed", poetry pf
 "Villanelle", Ambit, No 165 2001
 "When He is Silent", Ambit, No 165 2001
 
 
 
 
 
 
 
Mahabharata: A Modern Retelling. W. W. Norton & Company, Inc. 2015.

Translations
 "Two Women", Toeti Heraty, Poetry Translation Centre
 "A Woman's Portrait 1938", Toeti Heraty, Poetry Translation Centre
 "Geneva in July", Toeti Heraty, Poetry Translation Centre
 "Jogging in Jakarta", Toeti Heraty, Poetry Translation Centre
from The Mahabharata, The Poetry Society

Anthologies

Editor

References

1939 births
2019 deaths
English women poets
Academics of the University of East London
People from Kent
English sociologists
English translators
20th-century British translators
20th-century English women
20th-century English people